"The First Time" is a single by American country music artist Freddie Hart. Released in June 1975, it was the first single from his album The First Time. The song peaked at number 2 on the Billboard Hot Country Singles chart. It also reached number 1 on the RPM Country Tracks chart in Canada.

Chart performance

References 

1975 singles
Freddie Hart songs
1975 songs
Capitol Records singles
Songs written by Jack Grayson